Kieren van den Blink (born Silver Spring, Maryland) is an American actress, director, writer and producer. She went to The Peddie School in New Jersey and then to Barnard College, Columbia University. Van den Blink provided the voice for Rogue in the X-Men television series Wolverine and the X-Men.

Early life
Van den Blink graduated from Barnard College in 1995.

Filmography
 Drown Soda (1997), Alicia – Short movie
 Point Last Seen (1998), Young Rachel – TV movie
 Anywhere but Here (1999), Girl on T.V.
 The Four of Us (2001), Jamie – Short movie
 Without a Trace (2004), Erica Clemens – TV series, episode "Shadows"
 Numb3rs (2005), Nikki – TV series, episode "Vector"
 Fancy (2005), Amanda – Short movie
 Celebrity Deathmatch (2007), Lindsay Lohan (voice) – TV Series, episode "Where's Lohan?"
 Tyranny (2007), Isabelle Lorenz – also writer and associate producer
 Wolverine and the X-Men (2008–2009), Rogue (voice) – TV series, 8 episodes

External links

Living people
Actresses from Maryland
American film actresses
American people of Dutch descent
American television actresses
American voice actresses
Barnard College alumni
People from Silver Spring, Maryland
Year of birth missing (living people)
21st-century American women